was a town located in Asakura District, Fukuoka Prefecture, Japan.

As of 2003, the town had an estimated population of 12,746 and a density of 587.10 persons per km². The total area was 21.71 km².

On March 22, 2005, Miwa, along with the town of Yasu (also from Asakura District), was merged to create the town of Chikuzen.

External links
 Chikuzen official website 

Dissolved municipalities of Fukuoka Prefecture
Populated places disestablished in 2005
2005 disestablishments in Japan